Elijah Hicks (born October 16, 1999) is an American football safety for the Chicago Bears of the National Football League (NFL). He played college football at California and was drafted by the Bears in the seventh round of the 2022 NFL Draft.

College career
Hicks was ranked as a threestar recruit by 247Sports.com coming out of high school. He committed to California on January 10, 2017, over offers from Michigan, Notre Dame, UCLA, and USC.

Professional career
Hicks was drafted by the Chicago Bears in the seventh round with the 254th overall pick in the 2022 NFL Draft.

References

External links
 Chicago Bears bio
 California Golden Bears bio

1999 births
Living people
Players of American football from Long Beach, California
American football safeties
California Golden Bears football players
Chicago Bears players